Philippa Jane Glanville (nee Fox-Robinson), OBE, FSA (born 16 August 1943), formerly chief curator of the metal, silver and jewellery department of the Victoria and Albert Museum, is an English art historian who is an authority on silver and the history of dining.

Early life 
The second eldest of eight children of the Rev. Wilfred Henry Fox-Robinson and Jane Mary Home, she was educated at Talbot Heath School, Bournemouth, before going up to Girton College, Cambridge, where she read History, and taking a degree in Archives Administration at University College, London. While at Cambridge she took part in the archaeological excavations at Winchester conducted by Martin Biddle, later Professor of Medieval Archaeology at Oxford.

Career 
After graduating, she joined the London Museum (later the Museum of London) as curator in the Tudor and Stuart department, from 1966 to 1972, and as head of department from 1972 to 1980. Her interest in the history of food was stimulated in 1968 by curating a London Museum exhibition on Tudor food celebrating 400 years of ownership of Loseley Park, Surrey by the More-Molyneux family. In 1980 she moved to the Victoria and Albert Museum as an assistant in the metalwork department, of which she was chief curator between 1996 and 1999. She was encouraged by the director, Sir Roy Strong, to study the social history of silver and the hierarchy of status. This led her increasingly to examine the uses of silver at the table. Among her accomplishments at the V&A, she redisplayed the museum's silver collection to reveal how historic meals were served. On leaving she was appointed Academic Director at Waddesdon Manor, the former Rothschild seat in Buckinghamshire, where she remained until 2003. There, she created exhibitions that placed objects in situ, sometimes with elaborate recreations of the foods served in them by the historian Ivan Day. These included a display in the dining-room intended to show how Baron Rothschild might have dined in the 19th century, when he resided there; as well as an exhibition showing the use of French 18th-century porcelain, one of the strengths of the collection.

Among the exhibitions she has curated or worked on are A King's Feast The Goldsmith's Art and Royal Banqueting in the 18th Century, (the Danish Queen's French service) at Kensington Palace in 1991, Versailles et les Tables Royales en Europe, 1993, Feeding Desire; design and the tools of the table 1500-2005, for the Cooper Hewitt, Smithsonian Design Museum, New York in 2005 and Drink: A History 1695-1920, for the National Archives in 2007.

She served on the Council for the Care of Churches (now the Church Buildings Council), 1997-2001, and since 1998 has served on the Westminster Abbey Fabric Committee. She also serves as a vice-president of the National Association of Decorative and Fine Arts Societies (NADFAS). She is an assistant fellow of Warwick University, a liveryman of the Goldsmiths' Company and a founder liveryman of the Company of Arts Scholars. She was elected Fellow of the Society of Antiquaries in 1968 and appointed an Officer of the Order of the British Empire (OBE) in 2015.

Personal life 
She married Gordon Glanville in 1968, they were married until Gordon died in 2019. They had two sons James and Matthew and Philippa lives in Richmond, Surrey.

Her younger son, Matthew Glanville, is married to Annunziata Rees-Mogg, sister of the former House of Commons Leader Jacob Rees-Mogg

Her youngest sister, Sarah, has Down Syndrome. A rare disorder that affects a person's chromosomes.

Books 
This bibliography lists books of which Philippa Glanville is the author or editor, or to which she has been a contributor.
 
 London in Maps (Yale University Press, 1982). Paperback edition, 1985
 Silver in Tudor and Early Stuart England (V&A Publications, 1986)
 Silver in England (Unwin Hyman, 1987, Routledge edition, 2005)
 The Glory of the Goldsmith: Magnificent Gold and Silver from the Al Tajir Collection Charles Truman (preface by Philippa Glanville) (Christie, Manson & Woods, 1989)
 Women Silversmiths (with Jennifer Faulds Goldsborough) (National Museum of Women in the Arts, 1990)
 Versailles et les tables royales en Europe: XVIIème-XIXème siècles (contrib. Philippa Glanville) (Réunion des Musées Nationaux, 1993)
 Quand Versailles était meublé d'argent ed. Catherine Arminjon (contrib. Philippa Glanville) (Réunion des Musées Nationaux, 1997)
 The Albert Collection: Five Hundred Years of British and European Silver Robin Butler (ed. Philippa Glanville) (Broadway Publishing, 1999)
 Elegant Eating (editor and contributor) (V&A Publications, 2002)
 East Anglian Silver ed. Christopher Hartop (contrib. Philippa Glanville) (John Adamson, 2004)
 Royal Goldsmiths: The Art of Rundell & Bridge 1797-1843 ed. Christopher Hartop (contrib. Philippa Glanville) (John Adamson, 2005)
 Feeding Desire: Design and the Tools of the Table, 1500-2005 (contrib. Philippa Glanville) (Assouline, 2006) (paperback )
 Britannia and Muscovy: English Silver at the Court of the Tsars ed. Natalya Abramova and Olga Dmitrieva (contrib. Philippa Glanville) (Yale University Press, 2007)
 The Art of Drinking (ed. Philippa Glanville and Sophie Lee) (V&A Publications, 2007)
 A Noble Feast: English Silver from the Jerome and Rita Gans Collection at the Virginia Museum of Fine Arts Christopher Hartop (contrib. Philippa Glanville) (Virginia Museum of Fine Arts in association with John Adamson, 2007)
 Dinner with a Duke: Decoding Food and Drink at Welbeck Abbey 1695-1914 (Harley Foundation, 2010) (ASIN B009WPGQF4)
 Gold: Power and Allure ed. Helen Clifford (contrib. Philippa Glanville) (Paul Holberton, 2012)
 The Oxford Companion to Sugar and Sweets (contrib. Philippa Glanville) (OUP, 2015)

Other publications 
Numerous articles in: Antiquaries' Journal; Apollo; Burlington Magazine; Country Life; NADFAS Magazine; Silver Studies (formerly the Silver Society Journal); World of Interiors, &c.

References

External links
The Worshipful Company of Arts Scholars, Past Master

Living people
1943 births
People educated at Talbot Heath School
Alumni of Girton College, Cambridge
Alumni of University College London
Fellows of the Society of Antiquaries of London
Officers of the Order of the British Empire
English curators
British women curators
English art historians
People associated with the Victoria and Albert Museum
British women historians
Women art historians